Count Carl Carlsson Bonde af Björnö, more commonly known as Carl C:son Bonde (28 February 1897 – 8  May 1990) was a Swedish Army officer. Bonde was serving in the Swedish Army until 1939 when he joined the Swedish Volunteer Corps during the Winter War in Finland. Back in Sweden he became head of the department for interior affairs at the Defence Staff and finally retired from the military in 1957.

Early life
Carl, by birth member of the House of Bonde, was born on 28 February 1897 in Rytterne Parish, Västerås Municipality, Sweden, the son of Crown Equerry, Count Carl Bonde af Björnö and his wife Blanche (née Dickson). He was the brother of Thord Bonde and a half-brother of financier and Cabinet Chamberlain Peder Bonde.

Career

Military career
He was commissioned as an officer in the Life Regiment Hussars (K 3) in 1917 with the rank of second lieutenant and he graduated from Stockholm School of Economics in 1933. Bonde served as a captain in the General Staff in 1935 and he was military attaché in London from 1937 to 1938. He was a company commander in the Swedish Volunteer Corps during the Winter War in Finland from 1939 to 1940 and he was promoted to major in 1940. Bonde was a battalion commander in the Finnish Army from 1941 to 1942 and he became a Finnish lieutenant colonel in 1942.

When the German-friendly head of the Domestic Department in the Swedish Defence Staff, Major Thorwald Lindquist, was dismissed in October 1943, he was replaced with the Western-friendly Bonde who also was promoted to lieutenant colonel. Bonde was active in Operation Stella Polaris in 1944 before being relocated by the government to the National Swedish Office for Aliens (Statens utlänningskommission) where he was a member from 1944 to 1945. Bonde was promoted to colonel in the reserve in 1945 and retired from the army in 1957.

Other work
Bonde possessed the entailed estate of Vibyholm and leased the entailed estates of Hörningsholm and Tjolöholm until 1964. He was chairman of the students' union of Stockholm University College from 1932 to 1933 and the Stockholm University Student Union's federation board from 1933 to 1934.

Bonde was chairman of the Swedish Bridge Federation from 1960 and was vice chairman of the European Bridge League from 1950. He was chairman of the World Bridge Federation from 1968 to 1970.

Personal life
Bonde was married between 1920–1945 to Martha Elvira Augusta Elisabeth Mörner (born 1900), the daughter of the chamberlain and ryttmästare Hjalmar Stellan Mörner and Marta Jenny Hilda Carolina Sylvan.  He married for the second time in 1946, to Greta Swartling (1905–1961), the daughter of banking director John Swartling and Alice Borg. Bonde married a third time in 1962, to Countess Elisabeth Wachtmeister af Johannishus (1926–1972), the daughter of Hovjägmästare, Count Otto Wachtmeister and Brita Nordenstierna.

He was the father of Gustaf C:son Bonde (1921–1997); Catharina (1922–1968), who married the director of London School of Journalism, Geoffrey Butler (born 1898); and Cecilia (1926–2010), who married writer Henric Ståhl (1908–1991).

Death
Bonde died on 8 May 1990 in Mörkö, Södertälje Municipality.

Awards and decorations

Swedish
  Knight of the Order of the Sword (1938)
  Medal for Noble Deeds in gold

Foreign
  Order of the Cross of Liberty, 2nd and 4th Class with swords
  Order of the Cross of Liberty, 3rd Class with swords and oak leaf
  2 x Finnish War Memorial Medal with clasp and sword
  King Haakon VII Freedom Medal
  British commemorative medal

References

1897 births
1990 deaths
Swedish Army colonels
Swedish counts
Stockholm School of Economics alumni
People from Västerås Municipality
Knights of the Order of the Sword
Volunteers in the Winter War